The Hazel Rowley Literary Fellowship was set up in 2011 in memory of Hazel Rowley by her sister, Della Rowley and friends, in association with Writers Victoria Inc. The Fellowship was originally valued at AU$10,000, but was increased to AU$15,000 in 2017 and then to AU$20,000 in 2022.

Winners

Shortlists

References

External links 
 

Awards established in 2011
Australian literary awards
Australian literature-related lists